Hipnotation is a studio album by Australian jazz musician Dale Barlow, and released in 1991.

At the ARIA Music Awards of 1992 the album won the ARIA Award for Best Jazz Album.

Track listing
 "Thick As Thieves" (Dale Barlow) - 8:08
 "Hipnotation" (Barlow) - 9:01
 "Nothing's Enough" (Barlow) - 6:14
 "Bunyip" (Barlow) - 9:52
 "The Brahmin's Son" (Kevin Hays) - 9:31
 "Paradisiac" (Barlow) - 7:31

Personnel
Dale Barlow - saxophone
Essiet Okon Essiet - bass
Billy Drummond - drums
Kevin Hays - piano
Eddie Henderson - trumpet

References

1991 albums
ARIA Award-winning albums
Jazz albums by Australian artists